The WCT Latvian International Challenger is an annual tournament on the men's and women's World Curling Tour. It is held annually in October at the Tukuma Ledus Halle in Tukums, Latvia. 

The purse for the event is € 3,000, with the winning team receiving €1,000. 

The event has been held since 2017.

Men's champions

Women's champions

References

Women's World Curling Tour events
World Curling Tour events
Curling competitions in Latvia
Tukums